was a Japanese kin group which traces its origin to Hizen Province on the island of Kyushu.

History
The clan was founded by Fujiwara no Suekiyo in 1186. The clan was allied with Ashikaga Takauji in 1336, but they were defeated in fighting with the Ōtomo clan to the east and Shimazu clan to the south.

Ryūzōji Takanobu is known for expanding his clan's holdings. He took land from the Shōni clan. Ryūzōji Masaie (1556–1607) was the son of Takanobu.  In 1587, Masaie joined the forces of Toyotomi Hideyoshi against the Shimazu clan.  In the same year, he was confirmed as head of the Saga Domain (350,000 koku), but control of the domain passed to Nabeshima Naoshige when Masaie was killed in battle.

Notable clan leaders
 
 Ryūzōji Chikaie
 Ryūzōji Takanobu
 Ryūzōji Masaie
 Egami Ietane
 Gotō Ienobu
 Ryūzōji Naganobu
 Ryūzōji Nobuchika

Notable retainers 
 Nabeshima Naoshige
 Arima Harunobu
 Matsura Takanobu
 Ōmura Sumitada
 Gotō Takaakira
 Miyohime
 Hyakutake Tomonake married to Miyohime
 Kinoshita Masanao
 Narimatsu Nobukatsu
 Enjōji Nobutane
 Eriguchi Nobutsuna
 Harada Nobutane
 Naritomi Shigeyasu
 Ogawa Nobuyasu

References

Bibliography 
 佐賀新聞社 (2006/12).『五州二島の太守龍造寺隆信』.

External links
 龍造寺氏 on Harimaya.com 
 Naritomi Shigeyasu on Samurai-Archives.com 

 
Japanese clans